Lyle George Mehrkens (November 7, 1937 – January 21, 2018) was an American politician and farmer.

Mehrkens was born in Featherstone Township, Goodhue County, Minnesota. He graduated from Red Wing High School in Red Wing, Minnesota in 1956. Mehrkens then graduated from the University of Minnesota School of Agriculture in 1958. He served in the Minnesota National Guard. He lived in Red Wing, Minnesota and was a farmer. Mehrkens served in the Minnesota House of Representatives from 1979 to 1982. He then served in the Minnesota Senate from 1983 to 1992. Mehrkens was a Republican. Mehrkens died at his home in Red Wing, Minnesota.

Notes

1937 births
2018 deaths
People from Red Wing, Minnesota
Military personnel from Minnesota
University of Minnesota College of Food, Agricultural and Natural Resource Sciences alumni
Farmers from Minnesota
Republican Party members of the Minnesota House of Representatives
Republican Party Minnesota state senators